Valley Memorial Park (also known as Valley Memory Garden and Butte Cemetery) is a cemetery in Palmer in the Matanuska-Susitna Borough, Alaska.

See also 
 List of cemeteries in Alaska

References

External links
 
 

Buildings and structures in Matanuska-Susitna Borough, Alaska
Cemeteries in Alaska